The Australian five-pound note was first issued in 1913 and featured a scene looking along the Hawkesbury River near Brooklyn, New South Wales, from the railway toward Kangaroo Point. Upon decimalisation it had a value of 10 dollars.

Timeline

1913
Signatories: Collins/Allen
 
The first five-pound note was issued in 1913, with 693,442 being printed. The reverse of the note possessed horizontal red/yellow bands.

1914–1924
Signatories: Collins/Allen (1914–1917); Cerutty/Collins (1918–1924)
 
Following the discovery of forgeries, a mosaic of fives was added to the reverse of the note and the horizontal red/yellow bands on the first design were replaced by a vertical phasing of purple/yellow/purple. 10,293,018 of these notes were printed.

1924–1927
Signatories: Kell/Collins (1924–1926); Kell/Heathershaw (1927)

Designed and printed by Thomas S. Harrison, the note was made longer and narrower to improve printing efficiency (six notes could fit onto a sheet instead of four) and further security features were added: a basketweave watermark was used around the borders and the denomination appears in watermarks in the center of the note. 11,290,400 of these notes were printed.

1927–1933
Signatories: Riddle/Heathershaw (1927, Note issuing department); Riddle/Heathershaw (1927–1932, Commonwealth Bank); Riddle/Sheehan (1932–1933)

29,133,000 banknotes of this type were issued, the only change was the "Chairman of Directors, Note Issung Department, Commonwealth Bank of Australia" to " Governor, Commonwealth Bank of Australia".

1933–1939
Signatories: Riddle/Sheehan (1933–1939)

This was a new design and the last issue with King George V, and lasted three years after his death. The colour was blue but 181×79, and was legal tender. The obverse has the Kings portrait on the left with the coat of arms on the right sides, the reverse has on the left two men carrying bags and one rolling a barrel representing commerce, five was on the right side.

See also

 Banknotes of the Australian pound

References

External links
Reserve Bank of Australia Museum
Australian stamp

Banknotes of Australia
1913 establishments in Australia
1966 disestablishments in Australia
Five-base-unit banknotes